Michael Dwayne Fultz is a former professional American football player who played defensive lineman for four seasons for the New Orleans Saints, Baltimore Colts, and Miami Dolphins.  Fultz was selected with the 34th overall pick in the second round of the 1977 NFL Draft.  Upon retirement from the National Football League, he was as an Assistant Coach of the Lincoln High School (Lincoln, Nebraska) varsity football team.  He then served as the varsity team's Head Coach for 5 seasons.  He resigned as the Head Coach at the conclusion of the 2010 season. He was an automotive teacher at Lincoln High School.

References

1954 births
American football defensive linemen
New Orleans Saints players
Baltimore Colts players
Miami Dolphins players
Nebraska Cornhuskers football players
Living people